Charithra Surya Chandran (born 17 January 1997) is a British actress. She is known for her roles in the Amazon spy thriller series Alex Rider (2021) and the  Netflix period drama Bridgerton (2022).

Early life and education
Chandran was born in Perth, Scotland, the daughter of medical professionals. She was born into a Tamil Indian family. Her parents separated when she was two, and she left for India with her father where she stayed with her grandparents in Tamil Nadu, India. Upon returning to the UK when she was four, she went to school in Liverpool. She then boarded at Moreton Hall Preparatory School in Suffolk from six to eleven before settling down with her mother in Oxford for her teenage years whilst her father lived in Wales.

Chandran completed sixth form at Oxford High School. She then went on to graduate with a Bachelor of Arts in Philosophy, politics and economics from New College, Oxford in 2019. She participated in a number of productions during university and joined the National Youth Theatre. She worked part-time for the New Policy Institute after taking a gap year, during which she did drama as a hobby before deciding to make it her career, turning down a job offer from BCG.

Career
In 2021, Chandran joined the main cast of the spy thriller series Alex Rider as Sabina Pleasance for its second series on IMDb TV. Having auditioned before the first series aired, Chandran starred as Edwina in the second series, based on the novel The Viscount Who Loved Me, of the Shondaland-produced Netflix period drama Bridgerton alongside Jonathan Bailey and Simone Ashley in 2022.

In June 2022, Chandran voiced the courtesan Camille for BBC Radio 3 in an audio adaptation of Pam Gems' stage play, Camille, based on the novel La Dame aux Camélias by Alexandre Dumas fils. This production was shortlisted for the 2023 BBC Audio Drama Awards, Best Adaptation. Chandran has an upcoming role in the young adult romantic comedy How to Date Billy Walsh for Prime Video. It was announced that Chandran will lead and associate produce Song of the Sun God, a six-part drama series based on the novel of the same name by Shankari Chandran.

In September 2022, Chandran voiced the lead, Mia, in Meet Cute's series, A Mid-Semester Night's Dream. The series is a playful retelling of Shakespeare's A Midsummer Night's Dream. In this series, a group of graduate students discover a magical print of the play which makes them fall in love with whoever reads from it.

Filmography

Film

Television

Audio

Awards and nominations

References

External links
 
 

Living people
1997 births
Alumni of New College, Oxford
Scottish people of Indian descent
British actresses of Indian descent
British people of Indian Tamil descent
National Youth Theatre members
People educated at Oxford High School, England
People from Perth, Scotland